The 10th IBF World Championships (Badminton) were held in Glasgow, Scotland, between 24 May and 1 June 1997. Following the results of the mixed doubles.

Main stage

Section 1

Section 2

Section 3

Section 4

Final stage

External links
BWF Results

1997 IBF World Championships
World Championships